John Kernan Mullen (11 June 1847 – 9 August 1929) was an Irish-American businessman and philanthropist.

Origins

Mullen was born to Denis Mullen (1806–86) and Ellen Mulray (1816–88) in Ballinasloe, County Galway in June 1847.  John had an older brother Patrick (born 1844), as well as younger siblings Ella (born 1849), Denis (born 1850), Kate (born 1853) and another who didn't survive.

During the 1820s and 1830s, John's father Denis and uncle Thomas Mullen, "crafted barrels for the mills" of Ballinasloe, which had three oatmeal mills, two breweries and a flour mill. However, the advent of the Great Famine brought an end to whatever prosperity the family enjoyed.

Emigrate to U.S.
In 1856, the family emigrated to the United States, arriving in Boston. They settled at Oriskany Falls, Oneida County, New York, where Denis and Thomas purchased houses adjacent to each other, and close to the town mill, where John Mullen first worked at age fourteen. He soon dropped out of school to help support the family. At his first job with the Oriskany Flour Mill, he learned the operation and won the respect of the owner, who placed Mullen in charge of the mill before he was twenty.

In 1867, Mullen headed west looking for a mill in need of a miller. He spent time in Illinois and Atchison, Kansas. He settled in Troy, Kansas, where he was in charge of the Banner Flour Mills, owned by Tracey and Parker Company. In the fall of 1871, Mullen left for Denver, where he worked for West Denver Flour Mill owned by O. W Shackleton and Charles Davis.

Businessman
In 1875, Mullen decided to operate his own mill. Mullen leased the old Star Mill in north Denver as a partnership with Theodore Seth. After a year, he bought him out and the company became J.K. Mullen and Company. During the following years, Mullen took over the Iron Clad Mill, Sigler Mill, Excelsior Mill and opened the Hungarian Mill in 1882.

In 1885, the Colorado Milling and Elevator Company (CM&E) was formed as a trust to help stabilize unpredictable flour prices; area millers elected Mullen as general manager, thereby increasing Mullen's industry influence. In addition to milling, Mullen was involved in the land and cattle business, including the J.K. Mullen Land and Cattle Company located in Lamar, the Platte Land and Cattle Company in Logan County; and the Riverside Land and Cattle Company in Larimer County.

Among his contributions to the Colorado milling industry were his introduction of the Hungarian milling process (alternative to gristmill) and high-altitude flour.

Over time, Mullen entered the financial sector, first as president of Union Savings and Loan Association, later a director at the First National Bank of Denver. Mullen also served on Council of Defense, a body organized by Colorado governor Julius Caldeen Gunter in 1917 to prepare for recruitment and property defense after the U.S. entry into World War I.

Personal life

Mullen married Catherine Smith on 12 October 1874. They had five daughters. All are buried in the Mullen plot at Mount Olivet Cemetery (Wheat Ridge, Colorado) He became known as a philanthropist because of his numerous donations of land and money.

Among his most notable gifts:
 Funds for the construction of the J.K. Mullen Memorial Library at The Catholic University of America (in Washington D.C.) and a fund to provide ten annual scholarships for Colorado men to the university
 The land and one-quarter million dollars for building the J.K. Mullen Home for the Aged in Denver, presently known as the Little Sisters of the Poor Home for the Aged;
 Funds for the erection of St. Cajetan's Catholic Church, a large Hispanic parish;
 Major donations for the construction of the Immaculate Conception Cathedral;
 Established the John K. and Catherine S. Mullen Benevolent Corporation in 1924.

Honors
In recognition of Mullen's efforts on behalf of the Catholic Church, the Pope twice knighted him, first as a Knight of the Order of St Gregory and later as a Knight of the Order of Malta.

Death

Mullen died of pneumonia on 9 August 1929, aged 82, with an estimated net worth of $4 million. He was the first person to lie in state at Denver's Cathedral of the Immaculate Conception. After Mullen's death, his daughters established in-state the Mullen Home for Boys in his memory.

References

Sources
 Pride of the Rockies: The Life of Colorado's Premiere Irish Patron, John Kernan Mullen, William J. Convery III, University of Colorado, 2000; .
 John K. Mullen and Oscar Malo Collection, WH259, Western History Collection, The Denver Public Library.

1847 births
1929 deaths
American philanthropists
American Roman Catholics
Irish emigrants to the United States (before 1923)
Knights of Malta
Knights of St. Gregory the Great
People from Ballinasloe
Businesspeople from Denver